Peter the Great: The Testament is a Russian TV series about Peter the Great, made in 2011 and based on the novel by Daniil Granin's Evenings with Peter the Great.
The film was produced by Studio 2-B-2 entertainment and was shown on Rossiya 1, the Russian TV channel.

Plot 
The film tells the story of the last years of the great monarch, Peter. He appears sick, lonely, and very concerned about those who leave their country. He wants to marry a princess before he will die, so that the throne will be secured for the future monarch. His companions, loyal before, are now only concerned about their own future and their future fate, after the death of the emperor.
Who will get Russia and what will happen to the country after the death of the beloved Emperor?

Cast 
 Alexander Baluyev — Peter
 Elizaveta Boyarskaya — Maria Cantemir
 Irina Rozanova — Catherine I
 Sergei Makovetsky — Alexander Menshikov
 Alexander Filippenko — Pyotr Tolstoy
 Sergei Shakurov — Fyodor Romodanovsky
 Valery Solovyev — Paul Yaguzhinsky
 Mikhail Boyarsky — Prince Dmitry Kantemir
 Anna Kovalchuk — Anastasia-Trubetskaya Cantemir
 Cyril Astafiev — Antioh Cantemir
 Valery Grishko — Fyodor Apraksin
 Willem Mons — A favourite of the Empress 
 Lyudmila Shevel — Bulk
 Jeremy Noble — Dr Paulson
 Klaus-Dieter Bang — Blumentrost
 Alexander Bashirov — Court jester to Peter I Ivan Balakirev
 Igor Golovin — Makarov
 Vladimir Matveev — Alexey Kurbatov
 Mukhtar Gusengadzhiyev — Dowd
 Vladimir Borchaninov — Count Sheremetev
 Alexander Malyavin — Executioner
 Yuri Loparev — Efim Nikonov
 Galina Zhdanova — Tatiana Yushkova
 Konstantin Vorobyov — Doctor Palikula
 Ivan Krasko — Old Man
 Yefim Kamenetsky — Andrei Nartov
 Alex Zubarev — French engineer

Crew 
 Writers: Igor Afanasyev, Vladimir Bortko
 Director: Vladimir Bortko
 Producers: Anton Zlatopolsky, Vladimir Bortko
 Operator: Elena Ivanova
 Artists: Vladimir Svetozarov, Marina Nikolaeva
 Composer: Vladimir Dashkevich
 Dress: Larissa Konnikova
 Make-up: Lily Rusetskaya
 Installation: Leda Semyonova
 Sound: Sergei Moshkov
 First Assistant Director: Tatiana Rozantseva
 Director: Vladimir Bortko

Premiere 
The premiere took place on the channel "Rossiya 1" on May 14, 2011 (two series), and May 15 (two series).

Historical discrepancies 
 The famous treatise by Vatsyayana Mallanaga, Kama Sutra was translated into European languages only in the late-19th century.
 Dowd, played by Mukhtar Gusengadzhiyev, calls himself a Lezghin. The Lezgins became known in Russia only after Peter the Great's Caspian campaign of 1722-1723.
 In a conversation with the Empress Catherine I, Maria Cantemir categorically calls herself a descendant of the Byzantine imperial Palaeologus family. The Cantemirești family, who ruled in Moldavia, had Tatar roots going back to Murza Khan Temir (Murza the Iron Emperor), who settled in the  Moldavian principality in 1540 and adopted the Orthodox faith. On the other hand, Maria Cantemir's mother , belonged to the Cantacuzino family, which claimed descent from the Byzantine Emperor John VI Kantakouzenos.
 In an interview with Peter the Great, Maria Cantemir refers to the "Bulletin of the French Geographical Society» (Société de Géographie, founded in 1821).
 Count Pyotr Tolstoy, sitting in a boat on the Neva, calls a two-masted square-rigged ship a "frigate". In fact it is either a brig or a packet.
 The film, which takes place in 1722-1725, features  (died 1730, played by Sergei Shakurov), the son of Fyodor Romodanovsky (who died in 1717).
 The funeral procession of Emperor Peter (died 1725), with pall-bearers in 18th-century attire, passes through 21st-century Saint Petersburg.

Prizes and awards 
 The highest award of the city - Badge of Honor "For services to St. Petersburg" (BaltInfo 05/27/2011)
 "The Order of Merit of Moldova", Mikhail Boyarsky and Elizabeth Boyar, "a sign of the high recognition of special achievements in the development of Moldovan-Russian cooperation in the field of culture and talent for the realization of artistic images of the Moldavian Ruler Dmitry Kantemir and Princess Mary Cantemir in the film" Peter the Great. Will. " (CP SP 29/10/2011) (28/10/2011 Argumenty.ru) ("Arguments and Facts in St. Petersburg" 10/28/2011)

References

Russia-1 original programming
2011 Russian television series debuts
2011 Russian television series endings
2000s Russian television series
Cultural depictions of Peter the Great
Historical television series
2011 television films
Films based on Russian novels
Television shows directed by Vladimir Bortko
Russian drama television series
Russian political television series
Russian biographical television series